KROC-FM (106.9 MHz) is a commercial radio station serving Rochester, Minnesota. The station's transmitter is located near the Minnesota-Iowa border. The station is owned by Townsquare Media. It airs a Top 40 (CHR) music format. headquartered in Rochester MN

History
The station was owned by the Southern Minnesota Broadcasting Company, along with other properties in the area, but they were sold to Cumulus Media in December 2003. KROC-FM went on-the-air at 106.9 MHz in 1965 with an easy listening and classical music. In 1967, the hybrid format was dropped, and the FM began simulcasting with KROC-AM until the mid-1970s, then changed to an automated MOR format called The Great Entertainers. That format would be replaced with a highly successful Top 40/CHR format, under the FM 107 KROC moniker. In the 1950s, the owners launched a television station (KROC-TV), though that is now operated separately by Gray Television as KTTC.

On August 30, 2013, a deal was announced in which Townsquare Media would acquire 53 Cumulus stations, including KROC-FM, for $238 million. The deal is part of Cumulus' acquisition of Dial Global; Townsquare and Dial Global are both controlled by Oaktree Capital Management. The sale to Townsquare was completed on November 14, 2013.

Translator

Previous logo
 Longtime KROC-FM logo used from early 2006 until late 2016.

References

External links
KROC FM 106.9 official website
KROC AM 1340 official website

Radio stations in Minnesota
Contemporary hit radio stations in the United States
Townsquare Media radio stations
Radio stations established in 1965
1965 establishments in Minnesota